Steven John Wagner (born April 18, 1954) is a former professional American football defensive back in the National Football League. He played four seasons for the Green Bay Packers (1976–1979) and one for the Philadelphia Eagles (1980).

Football career
In 1976, he played for the Green Bay Packers.

1954 births
Living people
Players of American football from Milwaukee
American football defensive backs
Wisconsin Badgers football players
Green Bay Packers players
Philadelphia Eagles players